Hildah Tholakele Magaia (born 16 December 1994) is a South African soccer player who plays as a striker for Sejong Sportstoto.

Career

Club career

Magaia started her career with South African second-tier side Tuks. Before the 2017 season, Magaia signed for TUT in the South African top flight, helping their only league title.

Magaia was voted the Best  Player at the 2020 COSAFA Womens Championship tournament, earning herself a 2-year deal with Swedish club Morön BK.
 Before the 2022 season, she signed for Sejong Sportstoto in South Korea.

International career

Magaia represented South Africa at the 2019 Summer Universiade.

Magaia was part of the Banyana Banyana squad that featured at the 2022 Africa Women Cup of Nations in Morocco. At the tourney, she scored a 63rd-minute winning goal in a 2–1 win Group C match against Nigeria's Super Falcons and also Scored 2 goals in the Final against Morocco to win the trophy for the South African Female National Team

International goals

References

External links
 

1994 births
Living people
Women's association football forwards
Elitettan players
Expatriate women's footballers in South Korea
Expatriate women's footballers in Sweden
South Africa women's international soccer players
South African expatriate sportspeople in Sweden
South African women's soccer players
WK League players